Prithvi-vallabha was a Sanskrit title adopted by several rulers of different dynasties of India. 

The title is popularly associated with Parmara king Vakpati Munja (c. 972–990s).

Prithvi Vallabh may also refer to:

 Prithivivallabh, a 1921 Gujarati historical novel by Kanaiyalal Munshi
 Prithvi Vallabh (1924 film), a 1924 historical adaptation of the novel Prithivivallabh
 Prithvi Vallabh, a 1943 Hindi film based on 1921 novel directed by Sohrab Modi
 Prithvi Vallabh - Itihaas Bhi, Rahasya Bhi, a 2018 Indian TV series inspired by the novel

See also
Balhara (title), Arabic transliteration of the title